Hemirrhagus billsteelei is a tarantula in the Hemirrhagus genus of Mexican cave tarantulas. This tarantula is found in the Mexican state of Oaxaca. This tarantula was first described by Mendoza and Francke in 2018, and is named in honour of Bill Steele, because of his contributions of knowledge in Mexican caves.

Description 
This tarantula is purely black in colour, with some grey tones. It has a slender body, as it is advantageous for traversing through crevices. It can be distinguished from all other Hemirrhagus species, with the exception of Hemirrhagus perezmiles, in that it lacks tibial apophyses. It can be distinguished from the Hemirrhagus perezmiles as the shape of male palpal bulb is different.

References 

Natural history of Oaxaca
Endemic spiders of Mexico
Cave spiders
Theraphosidae
Fauna of the Sierra Madre de Oaxaca
Spiders described in 2018